Currently, all of the European microstates have some form of relations with the European Union (EU).

Andorra, Liechtenstein, Monaco, San Marino, and the Vatican City remain outside the Union, because the EU has not been designed with microstates in mind. Andorra is, by population, the largest of the five microstates with around 85,500 citizens according to a 2022 estimate. Two other small countries, Luxembourg and Malta, are full members of the EU and both inhabited by populations over 600,000 and over 500,000 respectively.

Status of relations
Andorra, Monaco, San Marino, and the Vatican City use the euro through monetary agreements with the EU, and have been granted the right to issue a limited number of euro coins. They were allowed to do so as they had used or been tied to the old eurozone currencies. Liechtenstein, on the other hand, uses the Swiss franc.

Liechtenstein is a full member in its own right of the Schengen Agreement, European Free Trade Association (EFTA) and Dublin Regulation on asylum and has signed an agreement to participate in the Prüm Decisions, while Monaco has an open border with France and Schengen laws are administered as if it were a part of France.  San Marino and the Vatican City, both enclaves within Italy, have open borders with Italy and are de facto part of the Schengen Area. No microstates can issue Schengen visas. None of them have any airport, but all have heliports. Monaco has the only seaport; the others are landlocked. Arrival from outside the Schengen Area is allowed in Monaco, but not in San Marino and the Vatican City as they have no border controls. 

Monaco is a part of the EU customs territory through an agreement with France, and is administered as part of France. San Marino and Andorra are in a customs union with the bloc. Liechtenstein, as a member of the EEA, is within the European Single Market and applies certain EU laws. All of the microstates are also part of other organisations such as the Council of Europe (except Vatican City) and the Organization for Security and Co-operation in Europe.

Iceland and Liechtenstein are members of the European Economic Area (EEA) through the EFTA. San Marino had considered joining the EEA in the past, and held a referendum on submitting an application for EU membership, which was approved by its electorate; however, not enough votes were cast for the result to be considered valid. Iceland was previously an official candidate for accession to the European Union.  Had Iceland acceded to the Union, it would have become the EU's smallest state measured by population, but twelfth largest by geographical size. The Icelandic government withdrew its application for membership in 2015.

Future of relations

Andorra, Monaco, and San Marino have all stated their desire to deepen relations with the EU. In November 2012, after the Council of the European Union had called for an evaluation of the EU's relations with these microstates, which they described as "fragmented", the European Commission published a report outlining options for their further integration into the EU. Unlike Liechtenstein, which is a member of the EEA via the EFTA and the Schengen Agreement, relations with these three states are based on a collection of agreements covering specific issues.  The report examined four alternatives to the current situation: 1) a Sectoral Approach with separate agreements with each state covering an entire policy area, 2) a comprehensive, multilateral Framework Association Agreement (FAA) with the three states, 3) EEA membership, and 4) EU membership.  The Commission argued that the sectoral approach did not address the major issues and was still needlessly complicated, while EU membership was dismissed in the near future because "the EU institutions are currently not adapted to the accession of such small-sized countries."  The remaining options, EEA membership and a FAA with the states, were found to be viable and were recommended by the Commission.  In response, the Council requested that negotiations with the three microstates on further integration continue, and that a report be prepared by the end of 2013 detailing the implications of the two viable alternatives and recommendations on how to proceed.

As EEA membership is currently only open to EFTA or EU members, the consent of existing EFTA member states is required for the microstates to join the EEA without becoming members of the EU.  In 2011, Jonas Gahr Støre, the then Foreign Minister of Norway which is an EFTA member state, said that EFTA/EEA membership for the microstates was not the appropriate mechanism for their integration into the internal market due to their different requirements than large countries such as Norway, and suggested that a simplified association would be better suited for them. Espen Barth Eide, Støre's successor, responded to the Commission's report in late 2012 by questioning whether the microstates have sufficient administrative capabilities to meet the obligations of EEA membership.  However, he stated that Norway was open to the possibility of EFTA membership for the microstates if they decide to submit an application, and that the country had not made a final decision on the matter. Pascal Schafhauser, the Counsellor of the Liechtenstein Mission to the EU, said that Liechtenstein, another EFTA member state, was willing to discuss EEA membership for the microstates provided their joining did not impede the functioning of the organization.  However, he suggested that the option direct membership in the EEA for the microstates, outside of both the EFTA and the EU, should be given consideration.

On 18 November 2013 the EU Commission published their report which concluded that "the participation of the small-sized countries in the EEA is not judged to be a viable option at present due to the political and institutional reasons", but that Association Agreements were a more feasible mechanism to integrate the microstates into the internal market, preferably via a single multilateral agreement with all three states. In December 2014 the Council of the European Union approved negotiations being launched with Andorra, Monaco and San Marino on such an agreement, and they began in March 2015. Andorran ambassador to Spain Jaume Gaytán has said that he hopes that the agreement will include provisions to make the states associate members of the Schengen Agreement. In January 2016, Andorran minister of foreign affairs Gilbert Saboya stated that he believes the agreement could be signed by 2018.

Summary

Integration level
This table summarises the various components of EU laws applied in the microstates. Some territories of EU member states also have a special status in regard to EU laws applied as is the case with some European Free Trade Association members and their sovereign territories.

Notes

Size comparison
This table provides a comparison between major statistics of the microstates to the smallest EU member states.

See also
 European microstates
 Foreign relations of the European Union
 Potential enlargement of the European Union
 Special member state territories and the European Union

Notes

Further reading

References 

Microstates
European Union
European Union
European Union
European Union
Third-country relations of the European Union
European Union